Ankarsrum is a locality situated in Västervik Municipality, Kalmar County, Sweden with 1,254 inhabitants in 2010.

Ankarsrum is known as the place where the Assistent kitchen appliance is manufactured since 1969, when Electrolux moved its production line to this town from Motala.

References 

Populated places in Kalmar County
Populated places in Västervik Municipality